The Ladd S. Gordon Waterfowl Complex is a group of four conservation area in New Mexico devoted to assisting birdlife in the region.

Management areas

The Ladd S. Gordon Waterfowl Complex contains four wildlife management areas in Valencia and Socorro County, New Mexico, near Bernardo.
The largest is La Joya and the second largest is the Bernardo Waterfowl Area (BWA). The WMAs are supported by sale of hunting and fishing licenses.
Along with the Bosque del Apache National Wildlife Refuge to the south, they feed half of the waterbirds that winter in the Middle Rio Grande Basin.

La Joya Unit

The La Joya Unit, established in 1957, is located at exit 169 on Interstate 25, to the east of the freeway. La Joya contains  of man-made ponds. 
As of 2008 La Joya was open for hunting between September and mid-January.

Bernardo Unit

It is located to the east of I-25 on U.S. 60.
The unit has a  tour loop, with three elevated observation platforms. More than 25,000 snow geese and 12,000 sandhill cranes winter in the Middle Rio Grande, and Bernardo is an important resting and feeding point.
Other wildlife include mule deer, coyotes, raccoons, pheasants, hawks, owls, quail, songbirds, different species of duck and occasional bald eagles.

Ladd S. Gordon

Ladd S. Gordon was a graduate of the University of New Mexico who began working with the Department of Game and Fish as a biologist and conservation officer, and became Director from 1963 until 1975. Gordon, who died in 1991, was known for a pragmatic approach to combining theory with practical experience in game management, and for allowing new approaches but monitoring them carefully to find ways to adapt, improve or eliminate them. He initiated a policy of holding public hearings on game management issues, and was successful in ensuring that legislature favorable to his department got passed.  After his death, the department established the Ladd S. Gordon Memorial Scholarship for graduate students in his honor.

The Tucumcari State Wildlife Area, home of Tucumcari Lake, was formerly known as the Ladd S. Gordon State Wildlife Area. It is to the east of Tucumcari and is frequented by wintering ducks from mid-October, and by geese from mid-November.

References

Citations

Sources

External links

 Ladd S. Gordon Waterfowl Complex - official brochure

Protected areas of New Mexico
Protected areas of Valencia County, New Mexico
Protected areas of Socorro County, New Mexico
Nature reserves in New Mexico